is a Japanese actress, voice actress, singer and former member of the band CoCo. She was born in Nakano, Tokyo. Her solo debut was on 14 September 1991.

Filmography

Film
Kyō no Kira-kun (2017), Kanon Okamura
Love and Lies (2017), Aoi's mother

Television drama
The Kindaichi Case Files (1995–96), Tomoyo Takashima
Toshiie and Matsu (2002), Kyōgoku Tatsuko
Tokumei Kakarichō Tadano Hitoshi (2003), Mayuko Shinmizu
Shiroi Kyotō (2004), Hanako Noda
Kekkon Dekinai Otoko (2006), Keiko Nakagawa

Television animation
Kochikame (1998–2004), Komachi Ono
Read or Die (OVA) (2001), Yomiko Readman
R.O.D the TV (2003–2004), Yomiko Readman

Discography

Singles 
 14 February 1991: 	Namida no Tsubomi tachi
 3 July 1991: 	Suiheisen de Tsukamaete
 7 November 1991: 	Nichiyo wa Dameyo
 26 February 1992: 	Joke ni mo Naranai Koi
 18 September 1992: 	Kamisama kara morratta Chance
 19 March 1993: 	Tenshi no Iru Nagisa
 1 December 1993: 	Dakishimete Destiny
 19 August 1994: 	Rakuen no Toriko
 10 June 1995: 	Girls, be Ambitious! 		
 10 February 1996: 	Shiawase-na hibi 		
 11 December 1996: 	French Kiss 		
 10 August 1997: 	Arigato

Albums 
 15 December 1991: 	Belong to You 	[PCCA-00338] 	 (mini album – 6 songs)
 25 March 1996: 	Kiss 	[AMCM-4243]

Video 
 21 March 1992: 	Belong to You (Rieko Miura First Concert) 		
 19 June 1992: 	Yume de Aitai – Sweet Dreams – Video Clips 1 		
 20 November 1992: 	Rieko's Vacation – Rieko Miura Second Concert 		
 2 June 1993: 	Rendez-vous RIEKO in New Caledonia & Vanuatu 		
 25 April 1996: 	Live at On Air East

Picture Books 
 2 October 1991: Virgo (kindai eigashokan)
 4 February 1993: Relish (Wani Books)
 30 November 1996: atashi (kindai eigashokan)
 Jul 2002: Hugs
 Sep 2004:

References

External links 
 

1973 births
Living people
People from Nakano, Tokyo
Japanese voice actresses
Japanese female idols
Japanese women pop singers
Singers from Tokyo
21st-century Japanese singers
21st-century Japanese women singers